Helix Pass is a small north–south pass  east-northeast of Mount Jamroga in the central Bowers Mountains of Victoria Land, Antarctica. The pass lies between two unnamed peaks and permits passage from the area at the head of Carryer Glacier to areas in the southern part of the Bowers Mountains. It was so named by the New Zealand Geological Survey Antarctic Expedition, 1967–68, because ascent of the pass required an all night trip with much zigzagging and climbing; thus named after the genus of land snail, Helix. This feature lies situated on the Pennell Coast, a portion of Antarctica lying between Cape Williams and Cape Adare.

References

Mountain passes of Victoria Land
Pennell Coast